Jullah Majra is a village in Shaheed Bhagat Singh Nagar district of Punjab State, India. The village is administrated by Sarpanch an elected representative of the village.

Demography 
As of 2011, Jullah Majra has a total number of 180 houses and population of 858 of which 480 include are males while 478 are females according to the report published by Census India in 2011. The literacy rate of Jullah Majra is 84.44%, higher than the state average of 75.84%. The population of children under the age of 6 years is 97 which is 10.13% of total population of Jullah Majra, and child sex ratio is approximately 980 as compared to Punjab state average of 846.

Most of the people are from Schedule Caste which constitutes 59.08% of total population in Jullah Majra. The town does not have any Schedule Tribe population so far.

As per the report published by Census India in 2011, 393 people were engaged in work activities out of the total population of Jullah Majra which includes 279 males and 114 females. According to census survey report 2011, 64.63% workers describe their work as main work and 35.37% workers are involved in Marginal activity providing livelihood for less than 6 months.

Education 
KC Engineering College and Doaba Khalsa Trust Group Of Institutions are the nearest colleges.

List of schools nearby:
K.C. Public School, Nawanshahr
GSSS Haila, Haila
Baba Karam Singh Public School, Daulatpur
U.K. Model High School, Langroya

Transport 

See also 
List of villages in India

References

External links 
 Tourism of Punjab
 Census of Punjab
 Locality Based PINCode

Villages in Shaheed Bhagat Singh Nagar district